Lithiophosphate is a natural form of (pure) lithium orthophosphate. It is an exceedingly rare mineral, occurring in some special types of pegmatites.

References

Lithium minerals
Phosphate minerals
Orthorhombic minerals
Minerals in space group 62